Galene (Ancient Greek: Γαλήνη Galênê means 'calm weather' or 'calm, tranquility') in ancient Greek religion was a minor goddess personifying calm seas. Hesiod enumerates her as one of the 50 Nereids, sea-nymph daughters of the 'Old Man of the Sea' Nereus and the Oceanid Doris, perhaps identical with her sister Galatea.

Meanwhile, Euripides mentions "Galaneia" (Galênaiê) as a daughter of Pontus and Callimachus refers to her as "Galenaia". A statue of Galene, next to that of Thalassa, was mentioned by Pausanias as an offering at the temple of Poseidon in Corinth.

The alternative name Galatea, which gained currency in the 18th century refers to same goddess.

Another character, Galene was named as a maenad in a vase painting.

Notes

References 

 Athenaeus of Naucratis, The Deipnosophists or Banquet of the Learned. London. Henry G. Bohn, York Street, Covent Garden. 1854. Online version at the Perseus Digital Library.
 Athenaeus of Naucratis, Deipnosophistae. Kaibel. In Aedibus B.G. Teubneri. Lipsiae. 1887. Greek text available at the Perseus Digital Library.
 Euripides, The Complete Greek Drama, edited by Whitney J. Oates and Eugene O'Neill, Jr. in two volumes. 2. Helen, translated by Robert Potter. New York. Random House. 1938. Online version at the Perseus Digital Library.
 Euripides, Euripidis Fabulae. vol. 3. Gilbert Murray. Oxford. Clarendon Press, Oxford. 1913. Greek text available at the Perseus Digital Library.
 Hesiod, Theogony from The Homeric Hymns and Homerica with an English Translation by Hugh G. Evelyn-White, Cambridge, MA.,Harvard University Press; London, William Heinemann Ltd. 1914. Online version at the Perseus Digital Library. Greek text available from the same website.
 Kerényi, Carl, The Gods of the Greeks, Thames and Hudson, London, 1951.
 Pausanias, Description of Greece with an English Translation by W.H.S. Jones, Litt.D., and H.A. Ormerod, M.A., in 4 Volumes. Cambridge, MA, Harvard University Press; London, William Heinemann Ltd. 1918. . Online version at the Perseus Digital Library
 Pausanias, Graeciae Descriptio. 3 vols. Leipzig, Teubner. 1903.  Greek text available at the Perseus Digital Library.

Maenads
Companions of Dionysus
Nereids